Ilie Bărbulescu (24 June 1957 – 1 February 2020) was a Romanian footballer, he was a member of Steaua București's winning squad for the European Cup in 1986 and for the European Supercup in 1987.

He played as a defender and spent the majority of his career with FC Argeș Pitești. On 25 March 2008 he was decorated by the president of Romania, Traian Băsescu with Ordinul "Meritul Sportiv" — (The Order "The Sportive Merit") class II for his part in winning the 1986 European Cup Final.

International career
Bărbulescu also won five caps for the Romania's national team, including two qualifying matches for Euro 1980 and World Cup 1986.

Honours

Club 
FC Argeș Pitești
Romanian League: 1978–79
Steaua București 
Romanian League: 1984–85, 1985–86, 1986–87
Romanian Cup: 1984–85, 1986–87
European Cup: 1985–86
European Supercup: 1986

References

External links
 
 

1957 births
2020 deaths
Sportspeople from Pitești
Romanian footballers
Romania international footballers
Association football defenders
Liga I players
Liga II players
FC Argeș Pitești players
FC Steaua București players
FC Olt Scornicești players
FC Dacia Pitești players